Recombinant feline interferon omega (RFeIFN-ω), sold under the brand name Virbagen Omega among others, is a recombinant version of a cat interferon alpha. It is used to treat a range of viral diseases in cats and dogs, including canine parvovirus, feline leukemia virus (FeLV), and feline immunodeficiency virus (FIV) in many countries. It is approved to be used by injection under the skin. RFeIFN-ω is produced in silkworm larvae using a baculovirus vector.

Side effects include hyperthermia and decrease in white blood cell count. These effects tend to be mild and transient. It is a immunostimulant in the interferon family.

The feline interferon "omega" gene was first cloned in 1992. It was first produced in silkworms by Ueda and coworkers in 1993. The protein is around 60% identical to human alpha interferons, but the Ueda team deemed it an "omega-type" interferon due to some motifs. Phylogenic analysis in 2007 puts it as an alpha-type interferon.

Research 
As the approved regimen is very costly, RFeIFN-ω has been experimentally used via other routes, including topical and oral protocols. RFeIFN-ω has also been used off-label to treat other viral infections. It has also been tried on cancer cell cultures.

RFeIFN-ω, delivered topically, is ineffective against feline upper respiratory tract disease caused by feline calicivirus.

Notes

References 

Immunostimulants